The International Community of Mennonite Brethren (ICOMB) was officially launched at the 1990 Mennonite World Conference in Winnipeg, Manitoba as a partnership of global Mennonite Brethren conferences.

ICOMB was originally conceived by leaders of MBMS International (now known as "Multiply") at an international mission consultation in Curitiba, Brazil in 1988. ICOMB functions as a framework for Mennonite Brethren conferences (national associations of congregations) worldwide to relate as peers rather than as mission churches under the structure of MBMS International. 

In 2005 the term "committee" was officially changed to "community" by the conference representatives assembled at ICOMB's annual leadership summit in Japan.

In 2005, Victor Wall, president and representative of the Paraguay-German Mennonite Brethren Conference, was chosen to be the first Executive Secretary of ICOMB. He completed his term in 2010. In 2011, David Wiebe of Canada was chosen to be Executive Secretary. He had resigned from his position as Executive Director of the Canadian Conference of Mennonite Brethren Churches in 2010. In 2018 Rudi Plett of the Paraguay-German Mennonite Brethren Conference, who had chaired the ICOMB Executive Committee 2011-2017, and then served as Associate Director overseeing the Latin American churches, was chosen to be Executive Secretary.

Membership

ICOMB members are national associations of Mennonite Brethren churches, also known as conferences. Names of members are listed by continent.

Africa 
Community of the Churches of the Mennonite Brethren of Congo – CEFMC

Evangelical Church of the Mennonite Brethren of Angola – IEIMA

Mennonite Brethren Church of Malawi - MBCM

Asia 
Conference of the Mennonite Brethren Church of India – CMBI

Japan Mennonite Brethren Conference – JMBC

Khmu Mission - KM

Europe 
Association of the Mennonite Brethren of Portugal – AIMP

Bund Taufgesinnter Gemeinden (Germany) – BTG

Conference of Mennonite Brethren Churches in Germany – AMBD

Mennonite Free Church of Austria – MFO

Mennonite Brethren Church of Bavaria – VMBB

Lithuania Free Christian Church – LLKB

Latin America 
Association of the Mennonite Brethren Church of Colombia – AIHMC

Brazilian Convention of Evangelical Mennonite Brethren Churches – COBIM

Council of the Mennonite Brethren Churches of Uruguay – CCHMU

Evangelical Convention of Paraguayan Mennonite Brethren Churches (Spanish) – CEIPHM

Paraguayan Mennonite Brethren Conference (German) – AHM

Mennonite Brethren Evangelical Church of Peru – IEHM

United Evangelical Church of Mennonite Brethren in Panama – IEUHM

Christian Peace Church of Mexico – ICPM

English North America 
Canadian Conference of Mennonite Brethren Churches – CCMBC

United States Conference of Mennonite Brethren Churches – USCMBC

See also
Canadian Conference of Mennonite Brethren Churches 
Japan Mennonite Brethren Conference 
US Conference of Mennonite Brethren Churches

External links
Official website

Mennonitism
Mennonite Brethren Church